is an English contract law case, concerning the formation of a contract that is informally made, and where evidence is contested.

The case involved two Russian oligarchs, and was a direct consequence of the privatization in Russia that followed the collapse of the Soviet Union. It was also the court's first paperless case. Commercial Court judge Dame Elizabeth Gloster heard the case.

Facts
Boris Berezovsky, known as one of the "Russian oligarchs" who became rich under the presidency of Boris Yeltsin, claimed that in 1995 he had made a contract with Roman Abramovich. Berezovsky alleged that the agreement was that he would share in half the profits generated by Sibneft, a Russian oil company. In 2001, he alleged that he was forced to sell his stake in the company because of threats made by Abramovich when Vladimir Putin’s government came into power. Abramovich denied any of this was true. The essence of the case was whether there was any credible evidence that an agreement had been made.

Judgment
Gloster J, in the Commercial Court division of the High Court, held that Berezovsky was not a credible witness, there had never been a certain agreement intended to be enforceable, and there were no threats.

Significance
The case was the last where Lord Sumption acted as a barrister. He delayed his appointment to the UK Supreme Court so that he could finish his work on the case. A year later, Berezovsky allegedly committed suicide by hanging himself.

See also

English contract law

Notes

English contract case law
2012 in British law
2012 in case law
High Court of Justice cases